Archie Shepp & Philly Joe Jones is an album by jazz saxophonist Archie Shepp and drummer Philly Joe Jones recorded in Europe in 1969 for the America label. The album was also issued by the Fantasy label.

Reception
The Allmusic review by Scott Yanow states: "This intriguing LP does not live up to its potential... Unfortunately, both of the sidelong pieces have recitations, the performances are overly long, and there is quite a bit of rambling."

Track listing 
 "The Lowlands" - 18:33 
 "Howling in the Silence: (a) Raynes Or Thunders (b) Julio's Song" - 21:40
 Recorded in Paris, France, November–December, 1969

Personnel 
 Archie Shepp - tenor saxophone, piano
 Philly Joe Jones - drums
 Anthony Braxton - soprano saxophone, alto saxophone
 Chicago Beau - soprano saxophone, harmonica, vocals
 Julio Finn - harmonica, vocals
 Leroy Jenkins - violin
 Earl Freeman - bass, vocals

References 

1970 albums
Archie Shepp albums
America Records albums
Philly Joe Jones albums